Idi Rayeuk is a town in Aceh province of Indonesia and it is the seat (capital) of East Aceh Regency.

Climate
Idi Rayeuk has a tropical rainforest climate (Af) with moderate rainfall from February to August and heavy rainfall from September to January.

References

Populated places in Aceh
Regency seats of Aceh